The Oberbauenstock is a mountain of the Urner Alps, overlooking Lake Lucerne in Central Switzerland. Its  summit is located on the border between the cantons of Nidwalden and Uri.

References

External links
 Oberbauenstock on Hikr

Mountains of Switzerland
Mountains of the Alps
Mountains of Nidwalden
Nidwalden–Uri border
Two-thousanders of Switzerland